Stenoptilia naryna is a moth of the family Pterophoridae.

References

Moths described in 2000
naryna